Ways to Strength and Beauty is a 1925 German cultural film directed by Wilhelm Prager. The 125 minute full-length silent film was produced by Ufa-Kulturabteilung of Weimar Germany. The film was first screened on 16 March 1925 and in a revised version on 11 June 1926 in the Ufa-Palast am Zoo in Berlin.

The documentary was an idealized, somewhat naive depiction of health and beauty in conformity with nature. The film offered a contrast to the rather hopeless lifestyles available in Berlin and other large cities of Germany during the 1920s and became an immediate success. It was the most popular and important German kulturfilm (cultural film) of this period.

Plot
The full-length silent film conceived in the UFA's cultural department shows sport, gymnastics and dance performances, but also the Roman bathing culture, in order to demonstrate not only intellectual education but also physical fitness based on the example of ancient gymnasiums and personal grooming. Physical exercise in the great outdoors was intended for preventive healthcare and prevent postural damage in adults caused by imbalanced seated occupations and the health promotion of children, but it was also a life-reforming (Lebensreform) alternative to the decadence of city life with anxieties, lack of exercise and tobacco consumption as well as national movement based on the model of gymnastics father Friedrich Ludwig Jahn. The film's scientific advisor was the German physician Nicholas Kaufmann, who also wrote the script. In contrast to traditional military sports, the film expressly addresses women, for example with gymnastics according to Bess Mensendieck, and shows sports training in a civilian function, for example for self-defense or rescue swimming.

Aesthetically, the film stages the human body in the style of classical antiquity by recreating numerous ancient scenarios and shows it extremely freely for the time. Studies in slow motion illustrate the muscular effect of individual exercises and movement sequences. The film features the first on-camera appearance of Leni Riefenstahl.

The film is divided into six parts with the titles:

Part one: The Ancient Greeks and the New Era
Part two: physical training for the sake of health: hygienic gymnastics
Part three: rhythmic gymnastics
Part four: the dance
Part five: sport
Part six: fresh air, sun and water

In the fifth part, numerous athletes of their time are shown, for example:

High jump: Leroy Brown (U.S.), 1924 Summer Olympics in Paris, 1.96 meters
Charlie Paddock, America's best sprinter training
Hubert Houben (Germany) beats the Olympic champions Paddock and Murchison (U.S.) as well as Porritt and Carr (Australia) in the 100-meter sprint
H.H. Meyer, America's best hurdler
Fencing: The Nadis' from Livorno, a family of famous fencers
Aldo Nadi, the Italian champion
Nedo Nadi, the world champion, winner of the 1912 Summer Olympics in Stockholm and 1920 Summer Olympics in Antwerp

In the sixth part "a good example of national leaders" like:

Arthur James Balfour playing tennis and
David Lloyd George playing golf, as well
John D. Rockefeller playing golf at the age of 85
the Norwegian royal family on skis
Benito Mussolini on horseback (later cut out) as well as
the German poet and Nobel Prize in Literature Gerhart Hauptmann and his wife on the beach in Rapallo

Reception
As an expression of body awareness that enjoyed general popularity since 1900 in the form of Freikörperkultur (free body culture), the Lebensreform (life-reform) movement and naturism, the film reached a mass audience in the Weimar Republic and was recognized as a rashly popular "large-scale advertising film". Various advisory journals on the subject of physical culture appeared at the same time.

The film was largely positively received in contemporary reviews, at most as too long and kitschy in some scenes. All in all, the film is about "the endeavors to ensure the proper care and training of the body" in large parts of the population, especially women with office activities in the expanding service sector. It is said to be of a "pure basic mood" and "far removed from arousing any offensive feelings with a fine tact" or to appear too instructive.

Because of its "overall immoral effect" especially on young people through a "glorification of nude culture and nude exercises", the Bavarian government, to which the governments of Baden and Hesse had joined, applied for the revocation of admission to public screening in the German Reich, at least in Bavaria and before the youth. The application was rejected by the Film Review Office, in regard to the protection of minors, only two film scenes had to be cut out "with the sheer display of naked female body beauty, that up to 'undressed' intensifies". For the normally perceived adult observer, if the film is viewed in an unbiased manner, there is no overall sexual incentive.

In retrospect, due to its "idolatry" of the human body, the film is regarded as the ideological forerunner of the National Socialist body cult, as celebrated not least in Leni Riefenstahl's later propaganda films. In Ways to Strength and Beauty, Riefenstahl made an appearance as an extra in a group of dancers. The entire opening sequences of both parts of Riefenstahl's later Olympic film are almost "a copy of Ways to Strength and Beauty".

As a historical documentary film about the emergence of rhythmic gymnastics as a mass sport, which marked such a fundamental change in movement behaviour at the beginning of the 20th century that it triggered a new physical culture, the film stylized physical exercise and represents "an interesting document in terms of film history".

Film technical specifications
Aspect ratio: 1.33:1
Sound type: Silent
Colour type: Black and white
Width: 35 mm
Frames per second: 18
Length in metres: 2567
Length in minutes: 125
Reels: 6 rolls

Bibliography

References

External links 
 

1925 films
1925 documentary films
Black-and-white documentary films
German documentary films
Films of the Weimar Republic
German silent feature films
German black-and-white films
UFA GmbH films
Leni Riefenstahl
1920s German films